"Tváre pred zrkadlom" ("Faces in Front of the Mirror") is a song by Slovak singer-songwriter Marika Gombitová, released on OPUS in 1989. The composition wrote Gombitová in collaboration with Kamil Peteraj.

B-side of the single promoted a song called "Ave Mária", composed by Gabo Dušík, for a change. Its live version was featured only on VA compilation Nežná revolúcia (1990), also released by OPUS.

Both tracks were available in common on CD as bonus tracks on a 2004 re-issue of her studio album Kam idú ľudia? (originally from 1990).

Official releases and formats
SK 7" Single, #9143 0739
 "Tváre pred zrkadlom" (Studio version)
 "Ave Mária" (Studio version)

SK CD album, #91 2214
 "Tváre pred zrkadlom" (Studio version)
 "Ave Mária" (Studio version)

SK Double LP, #9017 2240/41
 "Ave Mária" (Live version)

SK CD album, #91 2410
 "Ave Mária" (Studio version)

SK CD album, #None
 "Ave Mária" (Studio version)

Charts

Notes
A  On the music charts, B-side "Ave Maria" was more successful, scoring as the second most selling SP in Slovakia (following "Sľúbili sme si lásku" by Ivan Hoffman, while preceding "Pravda víťazí" by Tublatanka).

Credits and personnel
 Marika Gombitová - music, lead vocal
 Gabo Dušík - music (B-side)
 Kamil Peteraj - lyrics
 Peter Smolinský - producer
 OPUS Records - record label, copyright owner, marketing and distributor

References

General

Specific

External links 
 
 

1989 songs
1989 singles
Marika Gombitová songs
Songs written by Marika Gombitová
Songs written by Kamil Peteraj
Slovak-language songs